Jack Buetel (September 5, 1915 – June 27, 1989) was an American film and television actor.

Life
Born John Alexander Beutel in Dallas, Texas, he moved to Los Angeles, California in the late 1930s with the intention of establishing a film career, changing his name to read Buetel. Unable to find such work, he was employed as an insurance clerk when he was noticed by an agent who was impressed by his looks.

Introduced to Howard Hughes, who was about to begin filming The Outlaw, Buetel was signed to play the lead role as Billy the Kid, with the previously signed David Bacon being dropped from the film. Hughes also signed another newcomer, Jane Russell, for the female lead, and realizing the inexperience of his two stars, also signed veteran actors Thomas Mitchell and Walter Huston.

Buetel was signed to a standard seven-year contract at $150 per week and was assured by Hughes that he would become a major star. Filmed in late 1940 and early 1941, The Outlaw officially premiered in 1943 but was not widely seen until 1946. It was notable for suggesting the act of sexual intercourse, uncommon in mainstream movies of the era, and for allowing characters to "sin on film", without a suitable punishment also being depicted, in violation of the Production Code. Much of the publicity surrounding the release of the film focused on Jane Russell, and she established a solid film career, despite critics giving her performance in The Outlaw poor reviews.

Buetel's performance was also highly criticised, and he languished with Hughes refusing to allow him to work. The director Howard Hawks tried to secure his services for the film Red River (1948), but after Hughes refused to allow Buetel to take part, Montgomery Clift was chosen and Clift went on to an active film career.

In 1951, Buetel appeared in Best of the Badmen, his first film appearance in 8 years.

Over the next few years he appeared in five more films and made infrequent appearances on television.

In 1956, he landed the role of Jeff Taggert in Edgar Buchanan's syndicated western series, Judge Roy Bean. Others who appeared regularly in the 39-episode color series, set in Langtry, Texas, were Jackie Loughery, X Brands, Tristram Coffin, Glenn Strange, and Lash LaRue.

Buetel's last acting role was in a 1961 episode of Wagon Train.

He also appeared as himself in the 1982 Night of 100 Stars television special.

Personal life
Buetel was married to Cereatha Browning, and later Joann Jensen Crawford. He relocated to Portland, Oregon sometime in the 1970s.

Death
Buetel died in Portland, Oregon, and was buried at Portland Memorial Mausoleum.

Filmography

References

 Higham, Charles : Howard Hughes - The Secret Life. Putnam Berkeley Group, 1993.

External links

 
 

1915 births
1989 deaths
American male film actors
Male Western (genre) film actors
American male television actors
People from Dallas
Male actors from Portland, Oregon
20th-century American male actors
Burials at Portland Memorial Mausoleum